Gim Myeong-yun (fl. mid-16th century), also known as Kim Myeong-yun, was a scholar-official of the Joseon Dynasty who was involved in the Eulsa purge of 1545.  The Eulsa purge took place following the accession of Myeongjong of Joseon, which brought a new in-law family to power. He was serving as the governor of Gyeonggi province when Yun Won-hyeong began to kill his enemies in the government, including Minister of Punishments Yun Im as well as Minister of Personnel Yu In-suk. Gim told Yun that Prince Gyerim and Prince Bongseong had been aware of the plots of these ministers, and thus brought about the death of Prince Gyerim.

Notes

References

See also
Joseon Dynasty politics
List of Joseon Dynasty people
Purges in the Joseon Dynasty

16th-century Korean people
Gwangsan Kim clan
Year of birth unknown
Year of death unknown
Date of death unknown